The Golden Doll is a 2016 Chinese thriller film directed by Zhang Jiangnan. It was released in China by Xinyue Pictures on August 5, 2016.

Plot

Cast
Han Xue
Sattawat Sethakorn
Wu Yixuan
Zhu Shengyi

Reception
The film has grossed  at the Chinese box office.

References

Chinese thriller films
2016 thriller films